Thomas Hussey (died 25 March 1641) was an English politician who sat in the House of Commons  in 1640.

Hussey was the son of  Sir Edward Hussey, 1st Baronet and his wife Elizabeth Anton, daughter of George Anton of Lincoln.

In November 1640, Hussey was elected Member of Parliament for Grantham in the Long Parliament. However he died early in the following year.

Hussey married Rhoda Chapman, daughter of Thomas Chapman, of London. His son Sir Thomas Hussey, 2nd Baronet inherited the baronetcy. His son William was an ambassador under William III.

References

Year of birth missing
1641 deaths
English MPs 1640–1648
Heirs apparent who never acceded
People from South Kesteven District